The Corinthia Hotel Khartoum is a five-star hotel in central Khartoum, the capital of Sudan, on the meeting point of the Blue Nile and White Nile and in the centre of Khartoum's commercial, business, and administrative districts. It is located next to the Friendship Hall of Khartoum and the Tuti Bridge.

Architecture 
The hotel was opened on 17 August 2008. It has 18 guest floors, 173 rooms and 57 suites. The hotel has six restaurants and cafés and leisure facilities including spa, gym, tennis and squash courts.

Owner 
It was built and financed by the Libyan government at a cost of over 80 million euros. The building has an oval curved facade; like the Burj al Arab, the Yyldyz Hotel, and the Grand Millennium in Sulaymaniyah; it was designed to resemble a ship's sail. It is known as "Gaddafi's Egg" because it is funded by the Libyan government at the time.

References 

 
 

Buildings and structures in Khartoum
Hotels in Sudan
Hotel buildings completed in 2008
Hotels established in 2008